The Further Education Funding Council for England (FEFC) was a non-departmental public body of the Department for Education and Skills which distributed funding to Further Education and Sixth Form Colleges in England between 1992 and 2001.

It was created by the Further and Higher Education Act 1992 and abolished by the Learning and Skills Act 2000, being replaced by the Learning and Skills Council (LSC).

Background
The government's reasons for creating the FEFC were set out in their 1991 white paper Education and Training for the 21st Century.

Staff
During its nine-year life the FEFC had two chief executives and three chairs. The first chief executive was Sir William Stubbs and its second chief executive Prof David Melville. The first chair was Sir Robert Gunn followed by Lord Bryan Davies and Lord Tony Newton.

Resurrection?
In November 2009 David Willetts issued a consultation document on Conservative policy for Further Education. The document promised to reinstate the FEFC.

References 
Conservative 2009 consultation document http://www.davidwilletts.co.uk/wp/wp-content/uploads/2009/11/consultation-document.doc

External links
 Further and Higher Education Act, 1992 (for England and Wales)
 Learning and Skills Act 2000
 Digital Education Resource Archive (DERA) holds an archive of some digitized FEFC publications.

Education in England
Defunct public bodies of the United Kingdom
Defunct organisations based in England
Department for Education
Funding bodies of England
Public education in the United Kingdom
Government agencies established in 1992
Government agencies disestablished in 2001
1992 establishments in England
2001 disestablishments in England